Made in Bangladesh is the mark affixed to products manufactured in Bangladesh. It may also refer to:

 Made in Bangladesh (2007 film), a 2007 Bangladeshi film
 Made in Bangladesh (2019 film), a 2019 Bangladeshi film